Bain may refer to:

People
 Bain (surname), origin and list of people with the surname
 Bain of Tulloch, Scottish family
 Bain Stewart, Australian film producer, husband of Leah Purcell
 Saint Bain (died c. 711 AD), Bishop of Thérouanne, Abbot of Saint Wandrille

Fictional characters
 Bain (Wheel of Time), character from the novels by Robert Jordan
 Sunset Bain, a Marvel Comics character
 Sheriff Joe Bain, a character in the work of Jack Vance
 Miguel Bain, a character in the film Assassins
 Noah Bain, a character in the TV Series It Takes a Thief
 Bain, a character from the video game Payday 2

Companies
 Bain & Company, a global management consulting firm
 Bain Capital, a private equity group co-founded by Mitt Romney

Places
 Bain, Alberta, Canada
 Bain, Iran
 River Bain, Lincolnshire, England
 River Bain, North Yorkshire, England

Other uses
 Le Bain, a painting by Édouard Manet
 Pegas Bain, a Czech paraglider design

See also 
 Bane (disambiguation)
 Baine (disambiguation)
 Bains (disambiguation)
 Baines
 Bein